The Uganda national basketball team represents Uganda in international basketball competitions. It is administrated by the Federation of Uganda Basketball Associations (FUBA).

Uganda made its debut at the FIBA Africa Championship at its 2015 edition in Tunisia. There, Uganda beat Zimbabwe 72–64 to earn its first victory at the continent's prime tournament.

Outlook
At the AfroBasket 2021 qualification, Uganda had group plays against Egypt, Morocco and Cape Verde.

FIBA Africa Championship record

Team

Current roster
Roster for the AfroBasket 2021.

Depth chart

Past rosters
Team for the 2017 FIBA Africa Championship.

Team for the 2015 FIBA Africa Championship.

Head coach position
 Timothy Odeke – 2007–2009
 Mandy Juruni – 2015–2017
 George Galanopoulos – 2017
 Mandy Juruni – 2018–present

See also
Uganda women's national basketball team
Uganda national under-19 basketball team
Uganda women's national under-19 basketball team

References

External links
FIBA profile
Uganda Basketball Records at FIBA Archive
Africabasket – Uganda Men National Team

 
Men's national basketball teams
Basketball teams in Uganda
1963 establishments in Uganda